The First Presbyterian Church of Newton (or Newton Presbyterian Church) is a Christian house of worship affiliated with the Presbyterian Church (USA) located in the Town of Newton in Sussex County, New Jersey. This congregation, established in the 1780s, is overseen by the Presbytery of Newton.

The first church building was erected in the 1786 at the time Rev. Ira Condit, a 1784 graduate of Princeton University was installed as the congregation's first pastor. This first edifice was razed for a larger, second building at the site, erected 1828-1829. The third and present edifice was built in 1869–1872 of native blue limestone and described as being "plain but beautiful...in its simple style of architecture."  While described as simple, the building is a combination of architectural styles that is chiefly Italianate and Renaissance Revival architecture but incorporates elements associated with the Classical Revival and Romanesque Revival styles. The church was damaged in an 1893 fire, and restored with funds from parishioners, including Newton industrialist Henry W. Merriam (1828–1900).  At this time, Merriam donated several stained glass windows, including one over the altar depicting Jesus Christ in the Garden of Gethsemane.

On 26 October 1979, the First Presbyterian Church of Newton was placed on the New Jersey Register of Historic Places. It is also  included as part of the Newton Town Plot Historic District which was approved and entered on the National Register of Historic Places on 12 November 1992.

The current pastor (2013–present) of the First Presbyterian Church of Newton is the Rev. David E. Young. Ordained in 1987, he is a graduate of The College of Wooster; University of Maryland, College Park; and Princeton Theological Seminary, and has served Presbyterian congregations in Stillwater, New Jersey; Fargo, North Dakota; Midland, Minnesota; and New Albany, Indiana, before accepting a pastoral call to Newton.

See also
 Christ Church, Newton
 Newton Cemetery (Newton, New Jersey)
 Old Newton Burial Ground

References

External links
 
 Presbytery of Newton

Newton, New Jersey
Presbytery of Newton
Churches in Sussex County, New Jersey
Presbyterian churches in New Jersey
Churches completed in 1872
History of Sussex County, New Jersey
Italianate architecture in New Jersey
Renaissance Revival architecture in New Jersey
Churches on the National Register of Historic Places in New Jersey
1786 establishments in New Jersey
Italianate church buildings in the United States